The Mosakahiken Cree Nation (Cree: ᒨᓵᑲᐦᐃᑲᐣ môsâkahikan) is a First Nations located around the community of Moose Lake in northern Manitoba.

Its main reserve is Moose Lake 31A; other reserve lands in its possession include: Moose Lake 31C, Moose Lake 31D, Moose Lake 31G, and Moose Lake 31J. They are members of the Swampy Cree Tribal Council.

References

External links
 Aboriginal Canada - Mosakahiken Cree Nation
 Map of Moose Lake 31A at Statcan

Swampy Cree Tribal Council
Mosakahiken Cree Nation
First Nations in Northern Region, Manitoba